Fabián Horacio Coronel (born 29 June 1987) is an Argentine footballer who plays for Santamarina, as a right defender or defensive midfielder.

Career
A youth product of Club Atlético Vélez Sarsfield, Coronel left the club in 2008 to join Primera B Nacional club Tiro Federal. However, after appearing sparingly with the latter, he was loaned to Sportivo Luqueño and Čapljina.

In January 2011, Coronel moved abroad for the first time, joining Bosnian Premier League club Leotar Trebinje. He again featured in only five matches, and eventually returned to his home country, signing with Huracán de Tres Arroyos.

On 11 July 2012 Coronel moved to Instituto. He only featured in 11 matches in his only season, and subsequently was released.

In July 2013 Coronel went in a trial at Sport Recife. However, nothing came of it, and he signed with city rivals Santa Cruz.

On 8 January 2014, Coronel joined Paraná.

References

External links
Paraná Official Profile 

1987 births
Living people
People from La Matanza Partido
Sportspeople from Buenos Aires Province
Argentine footballers
Association football defenders
Association football midfielders
Association football utility players
Club Atlético Vélez Sarsfield footballers
Tiro Federal footballers
Sportivo Luqueño players
FK Leotar players
Huracán de Tres Arroyos footballers
Instituto footballers
Santa Cruz Futebol Clube players
Paraná Clube players
Primera Nacional players
Argentine expatriate footballers
Expatriate footballers in Chile
Argentine expatriate sportspeople in Chile
Expatriate footballers in Bosnia and Herzegovina
Expatriate footballers in Brazil
Argentine expatriate sportspeople in Brazil
Argentina youth international footballers
Campeonato Brasileiro Série B players